Allan Houston Dougall (July 17, 1836 – May 22, 1912) was a Scottish soldier who fought in the American Civil War. Dougall received the United States' highest award for bravery during combat, the Medal of Honor, for his action during the Battle of Bentonville in North Carolina on March 19, 1865. He was honored with the award on February 16, 1897.

Biography
Dougall was born in Scotland on July 17, 1836. He enlisted into the 88th Indiana Infantry. He died on May 22, 1912. His remains are interred at the I.O.O.F. Cemetery in New Haven, Indiana.

Dougall was a companion of the Indiana Commandery of the Military Order of the Loyal Legion of the United States.

Medal of Honor citation

See also

List of American Civil War Medal of Honor recipients: A–F

References

1836 births
1912 deaths
Scottish-born Medal of Honor recipients
People of Indiana in the American Civil War
Scottish emigrants to the United States
Union Army officers
United States Army Medal of Honor recipients
American Civil War recipients of the Medal of Honor